Beth Bailey is an American historian who writes about U.S. military history and the history of gender and sexuality. 

Bailey is currently a Foundation Distinguished Professor at the University of Kansas, where she teaches in the department of history and directs the Center for Military, War, and Society Studies, which she founded in 2015.

Biography 
Bailey was born in Atlanta on December 29, 1957, and raised in Smyrna, Georgia. In high school, she was first clarinetist in the Atlanta Symphony Youth Orchestra and a member of the Emory Wind Ensemble. She attended Northwestern University, graduating in 1979 with a B.A. in the American Culture Program. Bailey received her M.A. (1982) and PhD (1986) in U.S. history from the University of Chicago. 

Following visiting positions at the University of Hawaii and the University of Kansas, she taught at Barnard College, Columbia University (1989-1997); the University of New Mexico (1997-2004); Temple University (2004-2015), and the University of Kansas (2015–present). 

Bailey is married to historian David Farber, with whom she often collaborates. They have one son.

Awards 
Bailey’s research has been supported by the National Endowment for the Humanities, the Woodrow Wilson International Center for Scholars, and the American Council of Learned Societies, and she has twice received the Army Historical Foundation Distinguished Writing Award. 

Bailey was elected to the Society of American Historians in 2017, and has given talks or been a visiting scholar in Australia, China, France, Germany, Indonesia, Japan, Lebanon, the Netherlands, Russia, Saudi Arabia, and the UK.

Publications

Selected works

Edited works

Syntheses, texts, and readers

Series editor 
Bailey is the co-editor of the Military, War, and Society in Modern U.S. History series with Andrew Preston, at the University of Cambridge, Cambridge University Press, founded in 2017.

References 

Year of birth missing (living people)
Living people
University of Kansas faculty
University of Chicago alumni
Temple University faculty
21st-century American historians